CAM Jazz is an Italian jazz record label founded in 2000. It is part of group that also manages the labels CAM Jazz Presents, Black Saint/Soul Note, and DDQ (Dischi Della Quercia). The label's musicians have received several Grammy Award nominations.

CAM (Creazioni Artistiche Musicali) Jazz began as a branch of a company that issued movie soundtracks. Its catalogue is managed by producer Ermanno Basso. Early releases by the label were from Italian musicians such as drummer Roberto Gatto, trumpeter Enrico Rava, bassist Giovanni Tommaso, and pianist Enrico Pieranunzi, who recorded Play Morricone in a trio with bassist Marc Johnson and drummer Joey Baron. CAM Jazz signed Argentinian trumpeter Diego Urcola, Venezuelan pianist Edward Simon, and Italian saxophonist Francesco Cafiso when he was 16. The catalogue also includes American trumpeter Dave Douglas, Canadian trumpeter Kenny Wheeler, French pianist Martial Solal, Swedish bassist Palle Danielsson, American jazz ensemble Oregon and British drummer Martin France.

Awards and honors
Grammy nominations
 2006: What Now? by Kenny Wheeler, Best Jazz Instrumental Album
 2007: Viva by Diego Urcola, Best Latin Jazz Album
 2008: 1000 Kilometers by Oregon, Best Jazz Instrumental Solo (Paul McCandless); Best Instrumental Composition
 2010: Martial Solal Live at the Village Vanguard by Martial Solal, Best Improvised Jazz Solo

Associated labels
 Black Saint/Soul Note
 CAM Jazz
 CAM Jazz Presents
 Cam-Amico
 Cam-Campieditore
 Cam-Det
 Cam-Gong
 Cam-Phoenix
 Cam-TV Film
 Cam-TV Sorrisi E Canzoni
 Phoenix

References

External links
 Official Site
 CAM at Italian Soundtracks
 

Record labels established in 1959
Italian record labels
Companies based in Rome
Music in Rome
Soul music record labels
Soundtrack record labels
Jazz record labels